The 1982 Vuelta a España was the 37th edition of the Vuelta a España, one of cycling's Grand Tours. The Vuelta began in Santiago de Compostela, with a prologue individual time trial on 20 April, and Stage 10 occurred on 30 April with a stage from Puigcerdà. The race finished in Madrid on 9 May.

Stage 10
30 April 1982 — Puigcerdà to Sant Quirze del Vallès,

Stage 11
1 May 1982 — Sant Quirze del Vallès to Barcelona,

Stage 12
2 May 1982 — Salou to Nules,

Stage 13
3 May 1982 — Nules to Antella,

Stage 14
4 May 1982 — Antella to Albacete,

Stage 15a
5 May 1982 — Albacete to Tomelloso,

Stage 15b
5 May 1982 — Tomelloso to Campo de Criptana,  (ITT)

Stage 16
6 May 1982 — Campo de Criptana to San Fernando de Henares,

Stage 17
7 May 1982 — San Fernando de Henares to Navacerrada,

Stage 18
8 May 1982 — Palazuelos de Eresma (Destilerías DYC) to Palazuelos de Eresma (Destilerías DYC),

Stage 19
9 May 1982 — Madrid to Madrid,

References

1982 Vuelta a España
Vuelta a España stages